Fernelmont Castle is a fortified farmhouse or château-ferme in Noville-les-Bois in the municipality of Fernelmont, Wallonia, Belgium.

See also
List of castles in Belgium
Isabelle Brunelle

Sources
  

Wallonia's Major Heritage
Castles in Belgium
Castles in Namur (province)